Arthur Brofeldt (27 January 1868, in Taipalsaari – 27 August 1928) was a Finnish politician. He was a member of the Senate of Finland.

References 

1868 births
1928 deaths
People from Taipalsaari
People from Viipuri Province (Grand Duchy of Finland)
Finnish politicians
Finnish senators
University of Helsinki alumni